John Scudder may refer to:

 John Scudder (builder) (1815–1869), American builder
 John Scudder (physician) (1889–1971), American physician and blood specialist
 John Scudder Sr. (1793–1855), American medical missionary to India
 John A. Scudder (1759–1836), American politician
 John Milton Scudder (1829–1894), American eclectic medicine physician